District scolaire 01 (or School District 01) was a Canadian school district in New Brunswick.

District 01 was a Francophone district operating 35 public schools (gr. K-12) in Albert, Westmorland, Saint John, Charlotte, Kings, Queens, Sunbury, and York counties until June 30, 2012.

Enrolment was approximately 13,000 students and 1,700 staff.  District 01 is headquartered in Dieppe.

List of schools

High schools

 École L'Odyssée (Moncton)
 École Mathieu-Martin (Dieppe)

Middle schools

 École Carrefour de l'Acadie (Dieppe)
 École Le Mascaret (Moncton)

Elementary schools

 École Amirault (Dieppe)
 École Anna Malenfant (Dieppe)
 École Champlain (Moncton)
 École des Bâtisseurs (Fredericton)
 École Sainte-Bernadette (Moncton)
 École Sainte-Thérèse (Dieppe)
 École Saint-Henri (Moncton)

Combined elementary and middle schools

 École Abbey-Landry (Memramcook)
 École Arc-en-ciel (Oromocto)

Other schools

 École Sainte-Anne (Fredericton)
 École Samuel-de-Champlain (Saint John)

See also
List of school districts in New Brunswick

References

External links
Official Website
Schools in Francophone Sud School District

Former school districts in New Brunswick